Setanta Berlin GAA is a GAA club in Berlin, Germany which caters for all youth ages and adults. The club competes in Gaelic games in the European Championship.

History
Setanta Berlin was founded in 2014.

Honours
In 2019, four German-born Setanta players represented Europe Rovers / Germany in camogie and hurling in the 2019 World Championships in Waterford.

See also
 Gaelic Games Europe
 Deutscher Bund Gälischer Sportarten
 List of Gaelic games clubs outside Ireland

References

External links
 Official website

Berlin
Berlin
Sports teams in Germany
Sport in Berlin